Hay'at Tahrir al-Sham (HTS) (transliteration: , "Organization for the Liberation of the Levant" or "Levant Liberation Committee"), commonly referred to as Tahrir al-Sham, is a Sunni Islamist political and armed organisation involved in the Syrian Civil War. It was formed on 28 January 2017 as a merger between Jabhat Fateh al-Sham (formerly al-Nusra Front), the Ansar al-Din Front, Jaysh al-Sunna, Liwa al-Haqq and the Nour al-Din al-Zenki Movement; under the initiative of Abu Jaber Shaykh, an Islamist commander who had been the second Emir of Ahrar al-Sham. 

Proclaiming the nascent organisation as "a new stage in the life of the blessed revolution”, Abu Jaber called upon all factions of the Syrian opposition to unite under its Islamic leadership and wage a "popular Jihad" to achieve the objectives of the Syrian revolution, which it characterised as the ousting of the Assad regime and its Hezbollah partners from Syrian territories, and the formation of an Islamic government.

After the announcement, additional groups and individuals joined. The merged group is currently led by Jabhat Fatah al-Sham and former Ahrar al-Sham leaders, although the High Command also has representation from other groups. The more conservative and Salafist elements of Ahrar al-Sham defected to the new group. The Nour al-Din al-Zenki Movement split from Tahrir al-Sham in 2017, and the Ansar al-Din Front in 2018. Tahrir al-Sham's strategy is based on expanding its territorial control in Syria, establishing governance and raising popular support. In 2017, HTS permitted Turkish troops to patrol North-West Syria as part of a ceasefire brokered through Astana negotiations. Its policies has brought it into conflict with Hurras al-Deen, Al-Qaeda's Syrian wing. HTS had an estimated 6,000-15,000 members in 2022. 

Hay'at Tahrir al-Sham gives allegiance to the Syrian Salvation Government, which is an alternative government of the Syrian opposition in Idlib Governorate. While the organisation officially adheres to the Salafi school, the High Council of Fatwa of the Syrian Salvation Government - to which it is religiously beholden - consists of ulema from Ash'arite and Sufi traditions as well. In its legal system and educational curriculum, HTS implements the Shafi'ite thought and teaches the importance of the four classical Sunni madhahib (schools of law) in Islamic jurisprudence.

History

Background

Al-Nusra/JFS co-operated with Ahrar al-Sham for much of 2015–16. Leading Ahrar al-Sham cleric Abu Jaber had long criticized al-Nusra's affiliation to al-Qaeda as setting back the cause of the rebels, and had also been the focus of attempts to unify Islamist rebel elements. He led a more Islamist and less nationalist faction within Ahrar al-Sham, Jaysh al-Ahrar, which supported merger of Ahrar al-Sham with JFS. There were merger talks in late 2016, but these broke down. In early 2017 it clashed with rival Islamist groups in Idlib, in particular Ahrar al-Sham, but Jaish al-Ahrar detached itself from Ahrar al-Sham to merge with JFS in a new body.

Formation
Abdullah al-Muhaysini, Abu Taher al-Hamawi, and Abd ar-Razzaq al-Mahdi worked on the formation of the group. The new formation was announced on 28 January 2017.

According to Syria analyst Charles Lister, Ahrar al-Sham lost some 800–1,000 defectors to HTS, but gained at least 6,000-8,000 more from the merger into its ranks of Suqor al-Sham, Jaish al-Mujahideen, Fastaqim Union and the western Aleppo units of the Levant Front, and the Idlib-based units of Jaysh al-Islam. JFS meanwhile lost several hundred fighters to Ahrar al-Sham, but gained 3,000-5,000 fighters from its merger with Harakat Nour al-Din al-Zinki, Liwa al-Haq, Jaish al-Sunna, and Jabhat Ansar al-Din into HTS. Nour al-Din al-Zenki had at one time been supported by the US.

Consolidation of power (January-August 2017)

January

Soon after the group's formation, many local Syrians began referring to the group as Hetesh, which was an Arabic acronym meant as a pejorative, similar to the "Daesh" label applied to ISIL by much of the Arab world. This labeling indicated that many Syrians saw Tahrir al-Sham as no different from ISIL, especially given the similarities between Tahrir al-Sham's recent attacks and ISIL's massive offensive on rebel forces in 2014.

On 30 January, it was reported that there were around 31,000 fighters in Tahrir al-Sham.

February
HTS suffered losses from air attacks by Coalition forces. On 3 February, a US airstrike struck a Tahrir al-Sham headquarters in Sarmin, killing 12 members of HTS and Jund al-Aqsa. 10 of the killed militants were HTS members. The airstrike also killed HTS commander Ibrahim al-Rihaal Abu Bakr, according to analyst Kyle Orton.

There has been resistance to HTS by civilians in rebel areas it controls. On 3 February, hundreds of Syrians demonstrated under the slogan "There is no place for al-Qaeda in Syria" in the towns of Atarib, Azaz, Maarat al-Nu'man to protest against HTS. In response, supporters of HTS organized counter-protests in al-Dana, Idlib, Atarib, and Khan Shaykhun. In Idlib pro- Hayyat Tahrir al-Sham protests were held waving pictures of its emir Abu Jaber on 3 February 2017. Attendance at a speech by HTS cleric Abdullah al-Muhaysini was manipulated by drawing internally displaced persons and impoverished people with promises of motorcycles and refrigerators through a raffle.

On 4 February 2017, a US airstrike killed al-Qaeda commander Abu Hani al-Masri, who was a part of Ahrar al-Sham at the time of his death. It was reported that he was about to defect to Tahrir al-Sham before his death. On the same day, Tahrir al-Sham official Muslah al-Alyani criticized other groups for not joining Tahrir al-Sham, arguing that any group that "fought for Islam" would be bombed, regardless of terrorist designations. In his statement, he indicated that one of the reasons why most Ahrar al-Sham fighters refused to join Tahrir al-Sham was because the latter group contained terrorist-designated individuals.

Around 8 February, Abu Muhammad al-Maqdisi confirmed that 2 senior Jabhat Fateh al-Sham leaders loyal to al-Qaeda, including former al-Nusra deputy leader Sami al-Oraydi, left Tahrir al-Sham after its formation.

A speech was released by Abu Jaber on 9 February. He emphasized his group being an "independent entity" and praised his "brothers" in the "Syrian Jihad". The statement included derogatory rhetoric on Shia Muslims, saying the Shiites (“rejectionists”) will “enslave the region" if the rebels lose the war.

On 12 February, the Bunyan al-Marsous Operations Room, of which Tahrir al-Sham was a member, launched an offensive against the Syrian Army in Daraa's Manshiyah district. Tahrir al-Sham forces reportedly began the attack with 2 suicide bombers and car bombs.

On 13 February, clashes erupted between the previously allied Tahrir al-Sham and Jund al-Aqsa, also called Liwa al-Aqsa, in northern Hama and southern Idlib.

On 15 February, Ahrar al-Sham published an infographic on its recent defections, claiming that only 955 fighters had defected to Tahrir al-Sham. There were also reports that Ahrar al-Sham, the Sham Legion, Jaysh al-Izza, the Turkistan Islamic Party in Syria, and the Tamkin Brigade would soon merge to form a new organization called the Syrian Liberation Front.

On 19 February, HTS arrested local FSA commander Anas Ibrahim in Atarib, and, in response, an anti-HTS protest was held in the town.

On 20 February, a Ma'arat al-Numan Shura Council was created by the Sham Legion, Ahrar al-Sham, and Tahrir al-Sham.

On 22 February, the Combating Terrorism Center reported that Jabhat Fateh al-Sham had formed the Tahrir al-Sham group due to its fear of being isolated, and to counter Ahrar al-Sham's recent expansion during the clashes in the Idlib Province.

On 22 February, the last of Liwa al-Asqa's 2,100 militants left their final positions in Khan Shaykhun, with unconfirmed reports in pro-government media that they were to join ISIL in the Ar-Raqqah Province after a negotiated withdrawal deal with Tahrir al-Sham and the Turkistan Islamic Party. Afterward, Tahrir al-Sham declared terminating Liwa al-Aqsa, and promised to watch for any remaining cells.

On 26 February, a US airstrike in Al-Mastoumeh, Idlib Province, killed Abu Khayr al-Masri, who was the deputy leader of al-Qaeda. The airstrike also killed another Tahrir al-Sham militant. Abu Khayr's death left HTS freer to move away from al-Qaeda's control.

March
In early March 2017, local residents in the Idlib Province who supported FSA factions accused Tahrir al-Sham of doing more harm than good, saying that all they've done is "kidnap people, set up checkpoints, and terrorize residents."

On 16 March, a US airstrike struck the village of al-Jinah, just southwest of Atarib, killing at least 29 and possibly over 50 civilians; the US claimed the people targeted in the strike were "al-Qaeda militants" but the Syrian Observatory for Human Rights (SOHR), local residents and local officials have said that the building struck was a mosque filled with worshipers, which was subsequently confirmed by Bellingcat.

On the morning of 21 March, according to pro-government media, a US drone strike in Darkush, Idlib Province, killed Abu Islam al-Masri, described as an Egyptian high-ranking HTS commander, and Abu al-'Abbas al-Darir, described as an Egyptian HTS commander; however, the Institute for the Study of War reported that the commander killed was Sheikh Abu al-Abbas al-Suri.

On 24 March, two flatbed trucks carrying flour and belonging to an IHH-affiliated Turkish relief organization were stopped at a HTS checkpoint at the entrance to Sarmada. HTS then seized the trucks and the flour, which was intended for a bakery in Saraqib. The seizure caused 2,000 families in the area to be cut off from a free supply of bread.

April
In April 2017, Jaysh al-Islam attacked the HTS and expelled it from the territories under its control in Eastern Ghouta.

On 3 May, HTS arrested Suhail Muhammad Hamoud, "Abu TOW", a former FSA fighter, in a house raid in Idlib. Earlier, al-Hamoud had published a photograph of him smoking in front of a HTS billboard that prohibited smoking.

May
On 20 May, the main faction of the Abu Amara Battalions joined Tahrir al-Sham, which "now boasts a fighting force of some 50,000 militants" according to one pro-government media source. However, the covert operations unit of the Abu Amara Battalions based in Aleppo remained independent.

On 27 May, according to Al-Mayadeen, Tahrir al-Sham and Saraya Ahl al-Sham clashed with the Islamic State of Iraq and the Levant in the western Qalamoun Mountains near Arsal, Lebanon–Syria border. 33 fighters were killed from both sides.

On 29 May, Tahrir al-Sham arrested opposition activist and FSA commander Abdul Baset al-Sarout after accusing him of participating in an anti-HTS protest in Maarat al-Nu'man.

June
On 2 June 2017, defectors from the Northern Brigade's Commandos of Islam Brigade reportedly joined Tahrir al-Sham, although Captain Kuja, leader of the unit, stated that he is still part of the Northern Brigade.

July
During 18–23 July, HTS launched a series of attacks on Ahrar al-Sham positions, which were quickly abandoned. On 20 July 2017, the Nour al-Din al-Zenki Movement led by Sheikh Tawfiq Shahabuddin announced its withdrawal from Tahrir al-Sham amid widespread conflict between HTS and Ahrar al-Sham, and became an independent Islamist group. On 23 July 2017, Tahrir al-Sham expelled the remnants of Ahrar al-Sham from Idlib, capturing the entire city as well as 60% of the Idlib Governorate. HTS was now the dominant armed group in opposition-held NW Syria.

August
On 18 August 2017, Tahrir al-Sham captured 8 rebel fighters from the town of Madaya after it accused them of wanting to return to Madaya during a ceasefire agreement.

Attacks (early 2017)

On 25 February 2017, 5 Tahrir al-Sham suicide bombers attacked the headquarters of the Syrian military intelligence in Homs, killing dozens of security forces, including the head of the military security in Homs. Pictures of the attackers were released on Twitter. One of the attackers was a Khan Shaykhun native called Abu Hurayra (Safi Qatini), according to social media sources. The State Security branch chief and Military security branch chief died in the attack, according to social media sources. Hassan Daaboul was among the 40 assassinated by Hayyat Tahrir al-Sham. The explosion killed Ibrahim Darwish, a Brigadier General and the state security branch's chief. Syrian reporter Moussa al-Omar posted pictures of officers and soldiers who were killed. The War Center Media gave a figure of six suicide attackers and a death toll of thirty. The death toll was given at twenty by Moussa when he posted it a breaking. The death toll was given at thirty five on 24 February according to Moussa. The injured numbered fifty four and the dead numbered forty seven on 25 February according to Moussa. Abu Yusuf al-Muhajir, a Tahrir al-Sham military spokesman was interviewed by Human Voice on the bombings. Twenty-six names were released. Sheikh Samir bin Ali Ka'aka Abu Abdurrahman from Eastern Ghouta suggested that the attack was carried out by Iranians in a dispute between Russians and Iranians. Geneva-based opposition Syrians claimed that the Homs strike was carried out by the government. The attack took place the same time as the beginning of the Geneva Four talks. The attack was praised by Liwa Omar al-Farouq Brigade leader in Ahrar Al-Sham, Abu Abdul Malik (Mahmoud Nemah). The attack was mentioned in an article in the publication Al-Masra by Al-Qaeda in the Arabian Peninsula. HTS leader Abu Mohammed al-Julani mentioned the Homs attack, stating that it was a message for the "defeatist politicians" to "step aside." It has been disputed that the raid resulted in the death of Ibrahim Darwish. Tariq Abdelhaleem posted a tweet on the Homs attack by Tahrir al-Sham.

On 11 March 2017, Tahrir al-Sham carried out a twin bombing attack in the Bab al-Saghir area of Damascus's Old City, killing 76 and wounding 120. The death toll included 43 Iraqi pilgrims. The attacks were at a shrine frequented by Shi'ite pilgrims and militiamen. They were described in a statement attributed to Tahrir al-Sham as targeting Iran-backed militias and pro-Assad fighters.<ref>Syrian jihadists say responsible for Damascus double bomb attack  Reuters 12 March 2017</ref>

Beginning of decline, leadership passes from Abu Jaber (late 2017)
From September to November 2017, there were a series of assassinations of HTS leaders, in particular foreign clerics associated with the most hardline elements, such as Abu Talha al-Ordini, Abu Abdulrahman al-Mohajer, Abu Sulaiman al-Maghribi, Abu Yahya al-Tunisi, Suraqa al-Maki and Abu Mohammad al-Sharii, as well as some local military leaders, including Abu Elias al-Baniasi, Mustafa al-Zahri, Saied Nasrallah and Hassan Bakour. There was speculation that the assassinations were carried out either by pro-Turkish perpetrators, given the hostility between Turkey and HTS in Idlib, or by supporters of Johani's attempt to turn the organization away from hardline Salafi-jihadi positions. There were also high-profile defections from HTS in the same period, including Abdullah al-Muhaysini and Muslah al-Alyani. In December, HTS arrested several prominent jihadi activists, former members of al-Nusra who remained loyal to al-Qaeda and rejected HTS's turn away from Salafi-jihadist positions. The move was interpreted as an attempt to re-establish as a more pragmatic, pan-Sunni group, with a more civilian structure. Al-Qaeda leader Ayman al-Zawahiri denounced this turn.

HTS announced Abu Jaber's resignation as the group's leader on 1 October 2017. He was succeeded by Nusra Front founder Abu-Muhammad al-Julani, who had already been the de facto military commander.

On 1 October 2017, the ibn Taymiyyah Battalions based in the town of Darat Izza defected from Tahrir al-Sham.

In October 2017, Russia claimed to have injured Abu Mohammed al-Joulani in an air raid; HTS denied the claim.

In November 2017, violent clashes erupted between the Nour al-Din al-Zenki Movement and Tahrir al-Sham in northern Idlib and western Aleppo, mainly in the area between Atme and Khan al-Asal. HTS established the Syrian Salvation Government in Idlib, as a rival to the Syrian Interim Government recognized by other rebels.

In early 2018, there were reports that HTS had been significantly weakened, and now had "a small presence in Eastern Ghouta and declining influence in Idlib, northern Hama, and western Aleppo provinces", with just 250 men in Eastern Ghouta and a total of 12,000 fighters.

In February 2018, Tahrir al-Sham was accused of killing Fayez al-Madani, an opposition delegate tasked with negotiations with the government over electricity delivery in the northern Homs Governorate, in the city of al-Rastan. Hundreds of people, including fighters of the Men of God Brigade, part of the Free Syrian Army's National Liberation Movement group, proceeded to demonstrate against HTS in the city on 13 February. In response, HTS withdrew from Rastan and handed over its headquarters in the city to the Men of God Brigade. A breakaway faction of former HTS members was formed in February 2018, called the Guardians of Religion Organization.

HTS was left excluded of the 24 February ceasefire agreement on Eastern Ghouta. In late February, a group of armed factions, including Failaq al-Rahman and Jaysh al-Islam, wrote to the UN declaring they were ready to "evacuate" remaining HTS fighters from Eastern Ghouta within 15 days. At the same time in Idlib Governorate, Ahrar al-Sham, Nour al-Din al-Zinki and Soqour al-Sham entered into conflict with HTS, taking significant territory.

During late 2017 and early 2018, it co-operated with Turkey in Idlib, leading to deepening tensions between the more pragmatic leadership and more hardline (especially foreign fighters) elements hostile to working with Turkey. Some of the latter split in February 2018 to form Huras al-Din. The HTS leadership also cracked down on remaining ISIS splinter cells active in Idlib. By August, when HTS entered into (unsuccessful) negotiations with Russia and Turkey, HTS was estimated to have around 3,000–4,000 foreign fighters, including non-Syrian Arabs, out of a total of 16,000 HTS fighters. On 31 August, Turkey declared HTS a terrorist organization.

2019

Revival and victory in Idlib
In January 2019, HTS was able to seize dozens of villages from rivals, and afterwards, a deal was reached in which the civil administration was to be led by HTS in the whole rebel-held Idlib Governorate.

In the wake of the 5th Idlib inter-rebel conflict, HTS gained control of nearly the entire Idlib pocket, after defeating the Turkish-backed National Front for Liberation. Following their victory, Hay’at Tahrir al-Sham would immediately violate the ceasefire treaty brokered by Turkey and Russia by placing combat units in the demilitarized zone along the Idlib-Syrian Government border, and attack SAA encampments near the area. In response to these attacks, Syrian president Bashar al-Assad increased the number of troops garrisoned near Idlib, which some have argued is an impending renewed offensive in the region, following the Northwestern Syria Campaign, where pro-government forces retook the formerly rebel-controlled Abu al-Duhur Military Airbase that was captured by the FSA and Army of Conquest in 2015. In 2019, the U.S. Deputy Assistant Secretary Defense Michael Mulroy stated that “Idlib is essentially the largest collection of al Qaeda affiliates in the world.” 
On July 10–11, 57 pro-government fighters were killed when Tahrir al-Sham militants attacked Syrian positions near the fortified village of Hamamiyat. 44 militants were also killed.

 2020–2022

On 1 March 2021 it was reported that Hayat Tahrir al-Sham intensified its campaign against an al-Qaeda affiliate in Idlib.

As of 2 January 2022, the group was reportedly "trying to convince Syrians and the world that it is no longer as radical and repressive as it once was", voicing rhetoric about combating extremism, and shifting its focus to providing services to the refugees and residents of Idlib province through the Salvation Government.

In 2022, HTS took a significant amount of territory and several key settlements during the October 2022 Aleppo clashes.

Ideology and governance

Abu Jaber, one of Tahrir al-Sham's leaders, was arrested several times by the Syrian government accusing him of holding Salafi-jihadist beliefs. He was imprisoned at the Sednaya Prison in 2005 and released among several jihadist prisoners in 2011 who would form several Salafist rebel groups during the Syrian Civil War. Abu Jaber has also professed a belief in "Popular Jihad", a bottom-to-top approach in which jihadists would win the hearts and minds of the people, before setting out to establish jihadi governance, after receiving enough popular support, which is notably the opposite of ISIL's "elite Jihad" top-to-bottom approach by a vanguard. Ayman al-Tamimi of The Combating Terrorism Center reported in February 2017 that despite public statements by Tahrir al-Sham's leaders and partisans, the group was still mostly an al-Qaeda-aligned group.

On 18 June 2019, HTS released a statement offering condolences to Egypt's former President Muhammad Morsi upon his death. In an interview given to the PBS Frontline documentarian Martin Smith, Abu Muhammad al-Joulani stated regarding the religious doctrines and political goals of Tahrir al-Sham: "to limit the description of the HTS to only being a Salafist or jihadist, I believe, needs a long discussion. And I don’t want to comment on that now, because it would take a lot of research and study. We are trying today to talk about Islam in its real concept, the Islam that seeks to spread justice and aspires for building and for progress, and to protect women and preserve their rights, and for education as well. So if we agree that there’s an Islamic rule in the liberated areas, we say that there are universities, by Allah’s grace, full of students, two-thirds being female students. There are more than 450,000 to 500,000 students enrolled in schools. There are fully functioning hospitals in the liberated areas, and there are people working to build towns and pave roads. Others are trying to establish an economic system for people to live securely and peacefully. And there’s a judicial system that seeks to give people back their rights and not only to punish the wrongdoers.."

Educational curricula of Tahrir al-Sham teaches the Shafi'ite school, the predominant mad'hab in Syria, and emphasizes the importance of the four traditional schools of law for ensuring Muslim unity. In theology, Tahrir al-Sham officially follows the Athari school, while also allowing Ash'arite scholarship in educational institutes and co-operating with mosques run by Ash'ari Imams. As it consolidated power over the course of time, it also reduced its policy of moral policing, arguing that such duties were the role of "relevant ministries of the SSG". Commenting on the changes since 2020, a female Islamist activist campaigning for women's issues stated: “Pressure on individual behaviour fell with the creation of HTS.. Before, it would have been inconceivable to imagine that women could talk about politics like this. The pressure to wear the full veil (niqab) has also diminished... this situation is new. All the women wore the full veil after the liberation of Idlib. The current transformation exasperates religious hardliners, but more pressure cannot be exerted on society or it might get out of control."

In 2022, Tahrir al-Sham permitted the re-opening of churches in Idlib city, enabling the Christian residents to celebrate Mass. After a meeting with members of Christian clergy and civil activists, Joulani announced his policy to "protect" Christian participation in their religious rites and celebrations. He also promised restoration of properties unjustly seized from Christian citizens. However, Al-Qaeda aligned Hurras al-Din condemned the move, accusing the Salvation Government of changing Idlib to be "less Muslim". In response, Tahrir al-Sham leaders maintained that Sharia (Islamic law) safeguarded the rights of non-Muslim citizens to observe and teach their religious rites within their communities; arguing for the need for tolerance and peaceful relations between religious communities living in an Islamic government.

Public opinion

The ECHO Research Centre at Laurentian University conducted an opinion poll on 4,858 residents in several areas of Syria between 10 July 2017 and 28 July 2017. According to the poll's results, 77% of those surveyed disagreed with the Salafist ideology Tahrir al-Sham and other Salafist groups promote in Idlib, 73% rejected HTS-affiliated local councils in Idlib, 66% agreed that HTS is part of al-Qaeda in Syria, and 63% claimed that the dominance of HTS in Idlib will lead to a "second Tora Bora". Of those who participated in the poll, nearly all of them (close to 100%) considered HTS to be contrary to the goals of the Syrian opposition, although they were split in its extent. 51% of them considered HTS to be contrary to the opposition since its inception, 42% considered HTS to be previously consistent with the opposition, but is no longer so, and 7% considered HTS to be a counter-revolutionary organization.

Structure
Member groups

The groups in italic are defectors from Ahrar al-Sham which either left to join Jabhat Fateh al-Sham in the last few days of its existence, or joined its successor group Tahrir al-Sham.

 Jabhat Fateh al-Sham
 Jaish al-Muhajireen wal-Ansar
 Green Battalion
 Syrian Islamic Jihad Union (ex-Ansar Jihad)
 Khorasan group
 Suqour al-Ezz
 Imam Bukhari Jamaat
 Tawhid and Jihad Battalion ("Katibat al-Tawhid wal-Jihad")
 Army of Muhammad
 Jamaat al-Murabitin
 Bin Laden Front
 Al-Bara Dhu Nurayn Al-Sawa'iq Army of the Levant Supporters of Jihad
al-Ikhlas Brigade
Mutah Brigade
Ibn al-Qayyim Brigade
al-Qaqa Islamic Brigade
 Ansar al-Din Front
 Liwa al-Haqq
 Jaysh al-Sunna (Idlib and Aleppo)
 Ashida'a Mujahideen Brigade Rashid Battalions
 Battalions of Companions
 Qawafil Shuhada Abbas Brigade Free Men of the Central Mountain Saraya al-Aqsa Katibat Aswed al-Harb Lions of Rahman Battalion
 Jamaat Fursan al-Sunna
 Al-Sa'b al-Abiya tribal militias
 Tamkin Brigade Ahmad Asfan Battalions Taliban Battalion Mohamad al-'Asfourah Battalion Asaad al-Khilafah Abu Islam's Armored Brigade Al-Khattab Battalions Hudhayfah ibn al-Yaman Battalions Knights of the Levant Battalion
 Riya al-Jannah Battalion Lions of Hamza Battalion Al-Qadisiyah Brigade
 Jihad in the Path of God Battalion 
 Kurdish Janah
 Haryatan Mujahideen Battalions
 Four artillery and rocket brigades Company of Victory Brigade
 Mountain Lions Battalion Knights of the Caliphate Battalion Martyrs of Islam Front Tawhid Battalion Martyr Ibrahim Qabbani Battalion Katibat Bayt al-Maqdis Ansar al-Sham Abu Mohammed al-Hamawi Battalions
 Al-Oqab
 Jabhat as-Sadiqin
 Katibat al-Shahid Abu Usid.
 Katibat Ashbal al-Sunnah
 Kata'ib al-Sayf al-Umri
 Jabhat al-Sadiqin
 Liwa Ahl al-Sham
 Lightning Battalion
 Supporters of Justice Brigade
 Katibat al-Siddiq Abu Talhah al-Ansari Battalion
 1st Regiment (Idlib)
 Martyr Omar Djaluk Battalion Mufid A'awar Battalion
 Former Ahrar al-Sham Manufacturing Administration members
 Banner of Islam Battalion
 Special Forces Brigade
 Inghimasi unit
 Movement of Mujahideen of the Sunnis of Iran
 Jaysh al-Sham
 Abu Amara Battalions (main unit)
 Qassem Battalion Lions of Tawhid Battalion Martyr Khalid Zaarour Battalion Desert Regiment Sham al-Salayn
 Dawn of Islam Brigade Farouq Company al-Hijra Brigade Victory of Islam Ahrar Mariyaan Sunni Islam Brigade Ghuraba al-Sham (not to be confused with Ghuraba al-Sham, Jabhat Ghuraba al-Sham or Katibat al-Ghuraba)
 Urim al-Jaws Central Forces al-Hasakah group Katibat Khateeb Sariya Saeed Brigade (disputed)
 Conquest Brigade (Kafr Nabl group)
 Lions of Islam Brigade Lions of Banu Umayya Ahrar al-Sham unit in Darat Izza Ahrar al-Sham unit in Turmanin Abu Darda Islamic Union Brigade al-Ukhwat Brigade Hani al-Nasr Brigade Ajnad al-Sham (left in June 2017 to join Ahrar al-Sham, rejoined HTS in November 2017)
 Jaysh Usrah
 Imarat Kavkaz
 Soldiers of the Epics
Mountain Army
Qatih Badiya
Jamaat Bayt al-Maqdis al-Islamiya
 Army of Umar Ibn Khattab
 Army of Aleppo
 Army of Eastern Ghouta
 Army of Abu Bakr as-Sadiq
 Army of Idlib
 Army of Al-Badia
 Army of Hama
 Abdullah Azzam Brigade al-Imam Brigade (disputed)
 Usud al-Harb Brigade Ahl al-Bayt Brigade al-Majd Brigade Lions of Islam Brigade Artillery and Infantry Battalion (Junud al-Sham remnants)
 Army of Uthman Ibn Affan
 Army of  Al-Sham
 Army of Al-Hudud
 Army of Al-Sahi
Levant Revolutionaries Battalion
 al-Quds Brigades
 Glory of Islam Brigade
 al-Noor Islamic Movement
Banners of Islam Movement
Al-Tawhid Brigade in Kafarouma village
Army of Al-Ghab Plain
Army of Abu Bakr al-Siddiq
Mountain Army
Army of Omar bin al-Khattab
Army of Othman bin Affan
Army of Ali bin Abi Talib
Aleppo City Battalion

Leadership
Since October 2017, the "general commander" or emir of Tahrir al-Sham is Abu Mohammad al-Julani, who is also Tahrir al-Sham's "military commander"
and the emir of Jabhat Fateh al-Sham, who also led its predecessor organisation al-Nusra Front, the Syrian branch of al-Qaeda.

Previously, the general commander of Tahrir al-Sham was Hashim al-Shaykh, also known as Abu Jaber, who was the leader of Ahrar al-Sham between September 2014 and September 2015. On 1 October 2017, Abu Jaber resigned from his position as the general leader of Tahrir al-Sham and was replaced by Abu Mohammad al-Julan. Abu Jaber took another position as the head of HTS's Shura council.

Individuals in italic are defectors from Ahrar al-Sham, which either left to join Jabhat Fateh al-Sham in the last few days of its existence, or directly joined Tahrir al-Sham.

 Abu Jaber (emir, until October 2017)
 Abu Mohammad al-Julani (overall military commander, later emir)
 Abu Khayr al-Masri (senior leader)
 Abu Salih Tahan (military commander)
 Abu Ashida'a (military commander)
 Abu Ismael (military commander)
 Abu Musab Tunsi (military commander)
 Abu Islam (military commander)
 Abu Malik al-Shaami (military commander)
 Major Abu Hashem (military commander)
 Abu Yaqub (military commander)
 al-Hajj Baha' al-Sharm (military commander)
 Osama al-Homsi (military commander) Update (24 January 2017)
 Rachid Baradedi (military commander)
 Abu Badr al-Hijazi (military commander)
 Abu Hafs Manbij (judge)
 Abu Al-Battar Al-Jazrawi (judge)
 Abu Bara Al-Qahtani (media official)
 Abu al-Yazid Taftanz (media official)
 Abu Abdel Ghani al-Hamawi (administrator)
 Abu Mohammad al-Shari
 Abu al-Yaqzan al-Masri (sheikh)
 Abu al-Harith al-Masri (sheikh)
 Musleh Aliani (sheikh)
 Abu at-Tahr al-Hamwi (sheikh)
 Abu al-Fatah al-Farghli (sheikh)
 Abu Yusuf al-Hamwi (sheikh)
 Abu Mohammad al-Sadeq (sheikh)
 Suraqa al-Makki (sheikh)
 Abu Yahya al-Shami (sheikh)
 Iyad Mahmud (sheikh)
 Hamza Abu Husayn (sheikh)
 Abu al-Waleed al-Hannafi (sheikh)
 Abu Muhammad Nu'maani (sheikh)
 Abu Talha Shaib (sheikh)
 Abu Taher al-Hamawi (sheikh)

 Former groups 
 Nour al-Din al-Zenki Movement
 Supporters of the East Regiment (joined Ahrar al-Sham)
 Ibn Taymiyyah Battalions (joined Ahrar al-Sham)
 Tahrir al-Sham elements in Northern Aleppo City outskirts (joined Ahrar al-Sham)
 Farouq Army (remnants of the Farouq Brigades in northern Hama), later joined Jaysh al-Nasr
 Lions of Sunna Battalion
 Jaysh al-Ahrar
 Harakat Fajr ash-Sham al-Islamiya (became Ansar al-Din Front - Harakat Fajr ash-Sham al-Islamiya'')
 al-Murabitin Battalion
 Osama Battalion
 Abu Ali Yemeni Battalion
 Abu Hilal Zitan Battalion
 Former HTS groups that went to join the Syrian Liberation Front
Katibat al-'Iqaab
Sheikh Fadel al-Akel
Katibat al-Bayia Lillah
Katibat Usud al-Tawheed
Liwa al-Adiyat
Martyr Abu Omar Battalion
 Former HTS groups that went to join the Guardians of Religion Organization
Jaysh al-Badia
Jaysh al-Malahim
Jaysh al-Sahil
Saraya al-Sahil
Jund al-Sharia
Siriyatan Kabil

Former leaders
 Abdulrazzaq al-Mahdi (sheikh)
 Tawfiq Shahabuddin (sheikh of the Nour al-Din al-Zenki Movement, which left HTS in July 2017)
 Abdullah al-Muhaysini (sheikh, left in September 2017)
 Abu Kamal (Tamkin Brigade Commander, rejoined Ahrar al-Sham)

Political relations

Al-Qaeda
Since officially disassociating from Al-Qaeda in 2017, Tahrir al-Sham has formally established governance over many parts of North-West Syria. In November 2017, HTS launched a wide-scale crackdown on Al-Qaeda elements in Idlib and arrested prominent leaders from Af-Pak region and Al-Nusra Front such as Sami al-Oraydi. Emir Ayman al-Zawahiri opposed the split of HTS from Al-Qaeda, stating that it was a treasonous act done without his consent and further denounced the clampdown on foreign Jihadist fighters through an audio-statement. Several Al-Qaeda circles and supporters have also condemned Joulani and compared him to Abu Bakr al-Baghdadi because of the group's conflicts with other rebel groups, and have described him as an 'opportunist' as well as making claims that he is an agent of foreign powers. On 1 March 2021, it was reported that Hayat Tahrir al-Sham intensified its campaign against al-Qaeda affiliate in Idlib.

U.S. government accuses Tahrir al-Sham of working with al-Qaeda's Syrian branch on a covert level, despite its self-identification as a distinct organisation. Some analysts assert that many of the group's senior figures, particularly Abu Jaber, held similarly extreme views. However, Tahrir al-Sham has officially denied being part of al-Qaeda and said in a statement that the group is "an independent entity and not an extension of previous organizations or factions". In his 2021 interview to PBS News, Abu Muhammad al-Julani argued that financial co-operation with Al-Qaeda was necessary to defend Syrians from the tyranny of Assad regime, and stated that "even at that time when we were with Al Qaeda, we were against external attacks". Clarifying the reasons behind the termination of relations with Al-Qaeda, Julani said: "when we saw that the interest of the revolution and the interest of the people of Syria was also to break up from Al Qaeda organization, we initiated this ourselves without pressure from anybody, without anybody talking to us about it or requesting anything. It was an individual, personal initiative based on what we thought was in the public interest that benefits the Syrian revolution."

Ahrar al-Sham
According to Abdul Razzaq al-Mahdi, who was a leading scholar in Tahrir al-Sham, the groups do not particularly hate one another in the political or social battlefield. Certain members, however, do believe that a war between the two would be possible, since Ahrar al-Sham's attendance at the Astana talks labels it as a "moderate" faction, often seen as blasphemy within groups such as Tahrir al-Sham.

In February 2018 Ahrar al-Sham and the Nour al-Din al-Zenki Movement merged and formed the Syrian Liberation Front then launched an offensive against Tahrir al-Sham seizing several villages and the city of Maarrat al-Nu'man.

Designation as a terrorist organization

The US embassy in Syria confirmed in May 2017 that HTS had been designated a terrorist organization in March 2017. US State Department spokesperson further stated that a review of HTS's internal mechanism was being conducted to analyse "the issue carefully". The United States Ambassador to Syria stated that "HTS is a merger and any group that merges into it becomes part of al-Qaeda's Syrian network." and "the core of HTS is Nusra, a designated terrorist organization. This designation applies regardless of what name it uses or what groups merge into it." In May 2018, United States Department of State formally added HTS to its list of "Foreign Terrorist Organizations" (FTO).

Canada designated Tahrir al-Sham as a terrorist organization on 23 May 2018.

In August 2018, Turkey designated Tahrir al-Sham as a terrorist organization.

HTS Response 
In response to American designation of HTS as a terrorist organisation; Abu Muhammad al-Julani, distancing himself from past involvement with Al-Qaeda, stated in an 2021 interview to PBS Frontline: "Our message to them is brief. We here do not pose any threat to you, so there is no need for you to classify people as terrorists and announce rewards for killing them. And also, all that does not affect the Syrian revolution negatively. This is the most important message. The second message is that the American policies in the region, and in Syria in particular, are incorrect policies that require huge amendments... What we might have in common would be putting an end to the humanitarian crisis and suffering that is going on in the region, and putting an end to the masses of refugees that flee to Turkey or to Europe and create huge issues, either for the Syrian people, who are being displaced all over Europe, or for the Europeans themselves.. This is the issue that we can cooperate the most on, by helping people stay here, by providing them with a dignified life here, in the region, or by liberating the lands of these people so that they can return to their homes, instead of having Russia or the Iranian militias push them to flee abroad."

Foreign support

Qatar and Saudi Arabia accused of support
Iran's government in 2017 accused Qatar and Saudi Arabia of supporting Tahrir al-Sham.

Speculated alliance with Turkey
In 2018, Turkey designated Tahrir al-Sham as a terrorist organization and the Al-Nusra Front in 2014. The Turkish government once said it was opposed to Tahrir al-Sham (HTS), and had fought with it and declared it a terrorist organisation, and HTS's Syrian Salvation Government was a direct challenge to the Turkish-backed Syrian Interim Government.

However, since 2017 there have been times HTS, and in particular its pragmatic faction around Abu Muhammed al-Jolani, has fought alongside the SNA which is backed and funded by Turkey, has not stopped Turkey from setting up several observation posts in its controlled territory in Idlib Governorate, and has joined joint operations rooms with Turkish-backed groups while preserving its autonomy. The Clingendael Institute in November 2019 has described the Turkish policy since 2018 as attempting to divide the pragmatic elements from the dogmatic terrorist elements within HTS.

See also
 Army of Conquest
 Inter-rebel conflict during the Syrian Civil War
 List of armed groups in the Syrian Civil War
 List of terrorist incidents in Syria
 National Front for Liberation–Tahrir al-Sham conflict
 Northwestern Syria offensive (April–June 2015)
 Second Battle of Idlib

References

Anti-government factions of the Syrian civil war
2017 establishments in Asia
2017 establishments in Syria
Islamist groups
Islamism in Syria
Islamic terrorism in Syria
Paramilitary organizations based in Syria
Rebel groups that actively control territory
Salafi Islamism
Salafi Islamist groups
Jihadist groups in Syria
Anti-ISIL factions in Syria
 
Idlib
Organizations designated as terrorist by Turkey
Organizations based in Asia designated as terrorist
Organizations designated as terrorist by Canada
Organizations designated as terrorist by the United States
Organisations designated as terrorist by Australia
Jihadist groups